Hammered is the sixteenth studio album by British rock band Motörhead, released on 9 April 2002 via Steamhammer, their sixth with the label and beating the Bronze Records era total of original full-length album releases. It was also the beginning of distribution in North America, and other territories, under Sanctuary Records and their subsidiary Metal-Is.

Recording
Hammered was released on Metal-Is, a rock label owned by the then-new Sanctuary Records. The album was recorded in the Hollywood Hills at Chuck Reid's house with Thom Pannunzio producing. By this time, Motörhead had recorded several albums as a three-piece, with drummer Mikkey Dee, guitarist Phil Campbell, and original vocalist/bassist, Lemmy. In Joel McIver's memoir Overkill: The Untold Story of Motörhead, Dee is quoted as saying the album – which is noted for its darker subject matter and reflective tone – was influenced by the 9/11 attacks:

Release
In the Motörhead documentary The Guts and the Glory, Lemmy states:

The album is perhaps best remembered for The Game, written by WWE music composer Jim Johnston as the entrance theme for wrestler Triple H. At two WrestleMania events, WrestleMania X-Seven and WrestleMania 21, Motörhead would perform this song live as Triple H made his entrance to the ring. Triple H also contributed co-vocals on the spoken word track "Serial Killer".

Sleeve artwork
Joe Petagno, long time sleeve artist, had this insight into the concept of the album artwork:

Reception

AllMusic review states:

Lee Marlow of Classic Rock wrote in November 2013 that:

Track listing

Also includes a 16-minute MPEG on "25 & Alive Boneshaker", a preview of the (then) upcoming live album DVD of their 25th birthday concert in 2000, at the Brixton Academy in London.

Personnel
Adapted from the album's liner notes.
 Lemmy – bass, vocals
 Phil Campbell – guitars
 Mikkey Dee – drums
 Dizzy Reed – piano on "Mine all Mine"
 Triple H – co-vocals on "Serial Killer"
 Bob Kulick – guitars on "The Game"

Production 
 Thom Panunzio – producer ("Serial Killer), engineer, mixing
 Chuck Reed – producer, mixing ("Serial Killer), engineer
 Lemmy – producer ("Serial Killer)
 Bob Kulick – producer, mixing ("The Game")
 Bruce Buillet – producer ("The Game")
 Motörhead – producers ("The Game"), album cover design
 Bob Koszela – engineer
 Jim Danis – assistant engineers
 Jeff Rothschild – assistant engineer
 Bob Vosgien – mastering
 Bruce Buillet – mixing ("The Game")
 Motörhead – executive producers
 Joe Petagno – album cover design, Snaggletooth
 Stefan Chirazi – concept
 Mark Ambrose/Zen Jam – design
Gene Kirkland – photography

Charts

References

External links
Motörhead official website

2002 albums
Motörhead albums
Albums with cover art by Joe Petagno
Albums produced by Thom Panunzio
Sanctuary Records albums